February 2016

See also

References

 02
February 2016 events in the United States